This is a list of foreign players in Honduran Liga Nacional. The following players:
have played at least one official game for their respective clubs.
are listed as squad members for the current .
have not been capped for the Honduras national team at any level.
includes uncapped players with dual nationality.

In italic: Players currently signed, but have yet to play a league match.

In Bold: Current foreign Primera División de Fútbol Profesional. players and their present team.

Naturalised Players
  Denilson Costa - Olimpia, Motagua
  Marcelo Ferreira - Platense
  Vicente Daniel Viera - Olimpia, Motagua

South America (CONMEBOL)

Argentina 
 Héctor Amarilla - Marathon
 Juliano de Andrade - Deportes Savio
  Santiago Autino - Valencia
 Pablo Bocco - Motagua
 Marcelo Cabecao - Hispano
 Fabian Castillo - Platense
 Fabián Cuneo - Vida
 Sergio Diduch - Real Espana, Hispano, Motagua
 Hugo Domínguez - Motagua
 Leonardo Domínguez - Victoria
 Mariano Echeverría - Valencia
 Marcelo Estigarribia - Motagua
 Miguel Farrera - Platense
 Julián Fernández - Real España
 Emiliano Forgione - Platense
 Gustavo Fuentes - Platense, Marathon, Motagua
 Matías Galvaliz - Motagua
 Walter García - Olimpia
 Pablo Genovese - Marathon, Hispano, Vida
 Lucas Gómez - Motagua
 Nicolás del Greco - Olimpia
 Leandro Guaita - Victoria, Vida
 Néstor Holweber - Motagua
 Kevin Hoyos - Victoria
 Pablo Iglesias - Platense
 Ariel Leyes - Motagua, Marathon
 Maximiliano Lombardi - Motagua
 Mariano Lutzky - Vida
 German Mayenfisch - Motagua
 Pablo Medina - Platense
 Santiago Minella - Deportes Savio
 Héctor Gabriel Morales - Victoria
 Alejandro Naif - Victoria
 José Pacini - Motagua, Marathon, Real Espana, Vida, Victoria, Pumas UNAH
  Maximiliano Osurak - Platense
 Fernando Pasquinelli - Motagua
 Christian Pereira - Platense
 Sebastián Portigliatti - Motagua, Juticalpa
 Juliano Rangel - Deportes Savio 
 Fernando Regules - Marathon
  Juan Rial - Marathón
 Mario Antonio Romero - Platense
 Diego de Rosa - Olimpia
 Ricardo Rosales - Motagua
 Sebastián Rosano - Olimpia
 Jonathan Rougier - Motagua
 Gustavo Scioscia - Platense
 Eduardo Sosa - Motagua
 Franco Tisera - Victoria
 Danilo Tosello - Olimpia
 Luciano Ursino - Real España
 José Varela - Motagua
 Diego Vásquez - Motagua
 Pablo Vásquez - Olimpia
 Willian Veloso - Platense
 Santiago Vergara - Motagua
 Marcelo Verón - Platense
 Juan Yalet - Marathon
 Domingo Zalazar - Real Espana
 Juan Manuel Zandoná - Marathon

Brazil 
 Carin Adipe - Victoria
 Eberson Amaral - Marathon
 Ronaldo Barbosa - Vida
 Sergio Barbosa - Juticalpa FC
 Rafael Betine - Real Espana
 Wesley Braz - Marathón
 Marcelo Cabrita - Platense
 Douglas Caetano - Real Espana, Olimpia, Juticalpa
 Julio Cesar - Marathon
 Samuel Córdova - Victoria
 Ricardo Correia - Marathon
 Ney Costa - Deportes Savio
 Carlos Dias - Olimpia
 Luciano Emilio - Real Espana, Olimpia
 Caue Fernandes - Marathon
 Diogo Fernandes - Motagua, Victoria
 Everaldo Ferreira - Olimpia, Real Espana, Atletico Choloma
 Carlos Fretes - Real España
 Moacyr Filho - Necaxa, Hispano, Platense
 Jonatan Hansen - Real Espana,
 Allan Kardeck - Olimpia
 Marcelo Lopes - Platense 
 Silvian López - Marathon
 Douglas Mattoso - Real Espana
 Josimar Moreira - Parrillas One
 Jocimar Nascimento - Olimpia, Vida, Deportes Savio, Motagua
 Charles de Oliveira - Atlético Olanchano 
 Edilson Pereira - Deportes Savio, Platense, Marathon
 Matheus Santos Pinto - Real Sociedad
 Romário Pinto - Deportes Savio, Marathon
 Fábio Prates - Deportes Savio
 Bruno Rego - Victoria
 Jean Carles Rosario - Marathon
 Mauricio Sabillón - Marathon
 Pedro Santana - Real España, Motagua
 Allan do Santos - Olimpia
 Cristiano dos Santos	- Olimpia
 Marcelo dos Santos - Jaruense, Platense, Motagua 
 Espedito Serafín - Honduras Progreso
 Bruno da Silva - Victoria
 Edmilson da Silva - Marathon
 Nilberto da Silva - Marathon
 Israel Silva - Motagua, Marathon
 Lisandro Silva - Marathon
 Marcelo Souza - Deportes Savio 
 Fábio de Souza - Olimpia, Victoria
 Francisco Soares de Souza - Motagua

Chile  
 Carlos Ross - Platense
 Darlic Yerco Salinas - Palestino

Colombia  
 Mario Abadia - Honduras Progreso, Platense
 Camilo Aguirre - Real España
 Eder Arias - Platense
 Justin Arboleda - Marathon
 Juan Bolaños - Platense
 James Cabezas - Juticalpa
 Robert Campaz - Platense
 Luis Castro - Platense, Vida
 Mauricio Copete - Victoria, Olimpia, Motagua, Parrillas One	  
 Charles Córdoba - Motagua, Necaxa, Marathon, Parrillas One, Juticalpa, Atletico Choloma, Vida, Real Juventud
 Jaime Córdoba - Olimpia
 Javier Estupinan - Platense, Parillas One, Olimpia, Motagua
 Reynaldo Castro Gil - Honduras Progreso
 Omar Guerra - Olimpia
 Steven Jiménez - Victoria
 Edward Klinger - Honduras Progreso
 Jhovani Lasso - Deportes Savio
 Luis López - Platense 
 Geovani Mina - Deportes Savio
 Éder Munive - Marathón
 Oscar Piedrahita - Honduras Progreso
 Andres Quejada - Olimpia
 Roberto Riascos - Real Sociedad, Vida, Social Sol
 Harold Yépez - Atlético Olanchano
 William Zapata - Marathón

Paraguay  
 Alfredo Cristino Jara - Marathon
 Roberto Moreira - Motagua
 Miguel Ángel Payba - Honduras Progreso
 César Velásquez - Olimpia

Peru  
 Carlos Izquierdo - Broncos
 Mario Antonio Lobaton - Motagua
 Miguel Seminario - Motagua
 David Wendell - Motagua

Uruguay  
 Luis Ramon Abdeneve - Olimpia
 Héctor Acuña - Marathon
 Christian Alba - Vida
 Sergio Bica - Real Espana, Marathon
 Ramiro Bruschi - Olimpia, Real Espana
 Nicolas Cardozo - Real Espana, Marathon, Atlético Olanchano, Vida
 Juan Carlos Contreras - Olimpia, Motagua
 Marcelo Dapuerto - Motagua
 Fernando Garrasino - Motagua
 Christian Gutiérrez - Real España
 Mario Leguizamón - Olimpia
 Kerpo de León - Hispano, Platense, Vida, Motagua
 Robert Lima - Olimpia
 Máximo Lucas - Marathon
 Marcelo Macías - Real Espana
 Luis Maldonado - Platense, Marathon
 Richard Pérez - Vida
 Juan Obelar - Marathon
 Carlos Ramírez - Social Sol
 Jorge Ramírez - Real Espana
 Julio Pablo Rodríguez - Real Espana
 Richard Rodriguez - Vida
 Marcelo Segales - Marathon
 Diego Emilio Silva - Marathon
 Edgardo Simovic - Marathon
 Jonathan Techera - Marathon
 Óscar Torlacoff - Broncos UNAH, Motagua, Hispano, Atlético Choloma
 Mauricio Weber - Victoria

Venezuela  
 Giancarlo Maldonaldo - Real Espana

North & Central America, Caribbean (CONCACAF)

Belize 
 Elroy Kuylen - Platense
 Deon McCaulay - Deportes Savio
 Shane Orio - Marathon
 Harrison Rochez - Deportes Savio, Platense, Marathon, Nexaca
 Elroy Smith - Deportes Savio, Platense, Marathon, Vida
 Woodrow West - Honduras Progreso

Costa Rica 
 Allan Alemán - Real Espana
 Steven Bryce - Marathon
 Andy Furtado - Marathon
 Víctor Núñez - Real España
 Erick Scott - Marathon
 Roy Smith - Honduras Progreso, Marathon
 Omar Sumbado- Honduras Progreso

Cuba 
 Yaudel Lahera - Marathon

El Salvador 
 Salvador Azcunaga - San Pedro
 Lester Blanco - Real Espana, Marathon
 Diego Mejía - Motagua
 Chepe Leon Najarro - Honduras Progreso
 Fredy Orellana - Broncos de Choluteca, Universidad de Tegucigalpa
 Elmer Rosa- Broncos de Choluteca, Universidad de Tegucigalpa
 Luis Ramirez Zapata - Platense

Grenada 
 Jamal Charles - Vida

Guatemala 
 Guillermo Ramírez - Marathon, Motagua
 Gerson Tinoco - Juticalpa

Haiti 
 Rudy Lormera - Universidad

Mexico 
 Juan Carlos García - Marathón

Nicaragua  
 Salvador Dubois - Motagua
 Roger Mayorga - Motagua, UNAH, Marathón, Super Estrella de Danli
 Samuel Wilson - Atletico Olanchano

Panama  
 Richard Dixon - Platense
 Donaldo González - Olimpia
 Brunet Hay - Platense
 Angel Hill - Marathon
 Omar Jaén - Real Espana
 Ricardo James - Platense
 Luis Jaramillo - Victoria, Vida
 José Justavino - Motagua
 Manuel Mosquera - Victoria
 Luis Ovalle - Olimpia
 José Anthony Torres - Platense
 Alberto Zapata - Valencia

Saint Lucia 
 Malik St. Prix - Vida

Trinidad and Tobago  
 Jamille Boatswain -  Honduras Progreso
 Jerrell Britto -  Honduras Progreso
 Daniel Cyrus - Juticalpa
 André Ettienne - Honduras Progreso
 Akeem Roach - Vida
 Jan-Michael Williams - Juticalpa
 Rundell Winchester - Platense

Asia (AFC)

Japan

Africa(AFC)

Ghana 
 Wisdom Quaye - Vida

Mali 
 Mamadou Traoré - Platense

Sierra Leone 
 Abdul Thompson - Motagua

Zambia 
 Joseph Katongo - Motagua

Europe (UEFA)

Russia 
 Evgeni Kabaev - Real de Minas

Spain 
 Pablo Rodriguez - Marathon
 David Sierra - Victoria

External links
 
 
 

Liga Nacional de Fútbol Profesional de Honduras
Honduras
 
Association football player non-biographical articles